Brockdorff's Palace is one of the four palaces of Amalienborg in Copenhagen.

History
It was  built 1750-1760 by Baron Joachim von Brockdorff. Since 1765 Brockdorff palace has been owned by the crown, first used as naval academy and since 1828 as residence of various part of the royal family, among those King Frederick VIII. Therefore, the palace is also known as Frederick VIII's Palace.

It is one of the two palaces facing the Amaliehaven waterfront, the other being the residence of the Queen and Prince Consort.

From 1947 until 1972 it was the official residence of King Frederick IX and Queen Ingrid. The Crown Prince moved into the Palace 1934, and it was in use by the late Queen until her death 2000.

The restoration has been finished in 2009, and is nowadays the home of the Crown Prince and Crown Princess, thus official residence of the next King of Denmark.

Sources

the Palaces and Properties Agency

Palaces in Copenhagen
Amalienborg
Houses completed in 1760
Buildings and structures in Denmark associated with the Brockdorff family
Neoclassical architecture in Copenhagen